5 After Midnight, also known as 5AM, are a British boy band formed in 2016 during the thirteenth series of The X Factor, finishing in 3rd place. Their debut single, "Up in Here" peaked at 51 on the UK Singles Chart.

Career

2016: The X Factor

The group took part in the thirteenth series of the UK version of The X Factor. They competed in the "Groups" category mentored by Louis Walsh. In the finals, the group duetted with Louisa Johnson, where they performed hit single Tears. Eventually, they finished as the second runners-up, being defeated by Matt Terry and Saara Aalto.

2017: "Up in Here", The Sauce

In 2017, they released their debut single "Up in Here". Subsequently, the trio released their first extended play, The Sauce, featuring a total of 4 tracks.

2018–present: Dropped by Syco, Alleyne's departure

With the limited success that the band had, they were dropped by Simon Cowell's record label Syco.

In January 2018, Kieran Alleyne left the group to pursue a solo music career.

Discography

Extended plays

Singles

As lead artist

As featured artist

Tours
The X Factor Live Tour (2017)

References

English boy bands
British contemporary R&B musical groups
English pop music groups
The X Factor (British TV series) contestants
Black British musical groups
Musical groups established in 2016